He Who Fears the Wolf (1997) is a novel by Norwegian writer Karin Fossum, the third in the Inspector Konrad Sejer series.

References

1997 Norwegian novels
Novels by Karin Fossum
Norwegian crime novels